The 2022 Conference USA women's basketball tournament was the concluding event of the 2021–22 Conference USA (C-USA) women's basketball season. It was be held from March 8–12, 2022 alongside the 2022 Conference USA men's basketball tournament in Frisco, Texas, at the Ford Center at The Star.

Seeds

Schedule

Bracket 

* denotes overtime period.

References 

2021–22 Conference USA women's basketball season
Conference USA women's basketball tournament
College sports in Texas
Sports in Frisco, Texas
Conference USA women's basketball tournament
Conference USA women's basketball tournament